The 1999 London Marathon was the 19th running of the annual marathon race in London, United Kingdom, which took place on Sunday, 18 April. The elite men's race was won by Morocco's Abdelkader El Mouaziz in a time of 2:07:57 hours and the women's race was won by Kenya's Joyce Chepchumba in 2:23:22. 

In the wheelchair races, Switzerland's Heinz Frei (1:35:27) and Sweden's Monica Wetterström (1:57:38) won the men's and women's divisions, respectively.

Around 87,000 people applied to enter the race, of which 43,774 had their applications accepted and 31,582 started the race. A total of 30,849 runners finished the race.

Results

Men

Women

Wheelchair men

Wheelchair women

References

Results
Results. Association of Road Racing Statisticians. Retrieved 2020-04-18.

External links

Official website

1999
London Marathon
Marathon
London Marathon